Liberty Avenue is an  long west-east avenue in Brooklyn and Queens, New York City. It is bidirectional for most of its length, running between Mother Gaston Boulevard in Brooklyn in the west and Farmers Boulevard in Queens in the east. 

Liberty Avenue is known as "Little India Guyana-Trinidad and Tobago" because it mostly includes Indian, Indo-Guyanese, Indo-Trinidadian and Tobagonian, and Indo-Caribbean cultures and people there.

Liberty Avenue was co-named "Little Guyana Avenue" on May 29, 2021.

Transportation
The IND Fulton Street Line runs above the avenue between 80th Street and Lefferts Boulevard. Also, there is a station on the IND Fulton Street Line named Liberty Avenue.

The Q83 and Q112 buses serve the street in Queens; no buses run along it in Brooklyn.

References

Caribbean-American culture in New York City
Guyanese American
Indian-American culture in New York City
Indo-Caribbean culture
Indo-Trinidadian and Tobagonian culture
Streets in Brooklyn
Streets in Queens, New York
Trinidadian and Tobagonian-American culture